

Events calendar

+8